Shanghai Redtown Culture Development Co.,Ltd mainly focuses on three business areas that are cultural assets: investment, cultural assets management and cultural life. 
In 2005, Redtown Culture acquired Redtown Culture and Arts Community Investment and operation qualification by the bidding of the Shanghai City Hall. From that moment, Redtown Culture dedicated himself to developing such business fields as reuse of industrial heritage, city renewal, culture industry and any other related fields.

Company history 
In November 2005, Shanghai Sculpture Space was founded.

In January 2006, Shanghai Redtown Culture Development Co., Ltd was founded.

In June 2007, the second stage of Redtown Culture and Art Community opened.

In 2007, Redtown Culture received “China Creative Industry Annual Award 2007”

In 2008, Redtown was awarded “Shanghai Creative Space Public – Praise Prize ”.

In 2008, Redtown was awarded “Shanghai Culture Industry Park Visual Art Base”.

In August 2008, Bund 1919 Creative Garden opened.

In 2009, Shanghai Sculpture Space was awarded “National Heritage Board Industry Heritage Reuse Demonstration Units”

In November 2009, “Bund 1919 Art Bank” was founded in Bund 1919 Creative Garden.

In 2010, Redtown cultural and art community was awarded “Shanghai Creative Industry Model Clustering Park”.

In 2010, “Bund 1919 – Design, Art Creative Platform” rewarded National Service Industry Subsidy.

In 2010, Redtown Culture began to handle “Hanyangzao creative garden” project. This is the first time that Redtown Culture achieved branding output, taking the consulting and operation as a whole business service to customers.

In May 2011, Redtown Salon opened and Redtown Culture began to create a new commercial service platform.

In October 2011, Redtown Art & Design Centre was founded and started to develop the art and design industry in China.

In October 2011, Printmaking Workshop was founded and started to develop the Chinese limited printmaking market.

Company projects

Capital investment

The projects include:

Redtown Cultural and Art Community- a former steel factory which has been turned into Red Town, one of the trendiest creative districts on Huaihai Road. Shanghai Sculpture Space, the Minsheng Art Museum, Hong Kong fashion and lifestyle retailer Joyce Warehouse, and growing numbers of galleries, boutiques and studios can be found here. Red Town is an essential destination for architecture, sculpture and contemporary art buffs.

Shanghai Sculpture Space

Built in the early 20th century, the warehouse was originally a steelmaking factory that had long stood unused before developers recognized its potential.Under the leadership of CPC Branch of Shanghai and the municipal government, the former No.10 Steel Plant of Shanghai Steel Company was finally chosen as the site for Shanghai Sculpture Space that is located at 570 West Huaihai Road, Shanghai. 

Shanghai Sculpture Space covers an area of about 50,000 square meters, comprising the Urban Sculpture Center, the Sculpture Plaza and the support facilities. Currently, a total area of 10,000 square meters of the architecture is open to the public, including 6,000 square meters of chamber public art exhibition space; also open to the public is the Sculpture Plaza with an area of 15,000 square meters including 10,000 square meters of open air display space. According to the plan, the site and its neighboring region will gradually become a public art center with the most dynamics in the urban area upon the completion of the construction of Shanghai Sculpture Space. 

Bund 1919 Creative Garden

Bund 1919 Cultural and Creative Industry Park is located in No.258, West Songxing Road, Baoshan District, composed of more than 30 modern buildings and historic preservation buildings, forming an extremely perfect and classical building group. Since its former was Dazhonghua Cotton Mill founded by Mr. Nie Yuntai, a leading authority in China's textiles industry, and it is located at the semi-circle place formed by intersection of Yunzaobang River and Sitang River, it is named as "BUND 1919".
Redtown Art and Design Centre

Capital management

The projects include:
Han Yang Zao
China Clothing Island
Hong Kong Cultural and Creative Industrial Centre
Xinhua Road Historical and Cultural District Plan
Singapore Gillman Village
Tongji University Project: Shanghai International Design Place

Cultural life

The projects include:
Redtown Salon
RedRobe Tea
Printing Workshop

References

External links

Companies based in Shanghai